America: The Motion Picture is a 2021 American comedy film directed by Matt Thompson and written by Dave Callaham. It stars Channing Tatum (also a producer), Jason Mantzoukas, Olivia Munn, Bobby Moynihan, Judy Greer, Will Forte, Raoul Max Trujillo, Killer Mike, Simon Pegg and Andy Samberg. It is a R-rated, animated parody of George Washington and his fight against the British. The film uses anachronism, ahistoricism, and Americentrism to create a comic effect. Dates, the roles of various historical figures, battles, notable inventions and technologies are changed, reinvented or outright created. Prominent events and figures from the American Revolutionary War period and American history through to the 20th century are moved into the film's 1776 setting. Netflix released America: The Motion Picture was released on June 30, 2021. It received generally negative reviews from critics, who criticized it as being unfunny.

Plot
On July 1776, just after signing the Declaration of Independence, Benedict Arnold appears and murders all of its signatories, destroying Independence Hall, and stealing the Declaration. He goes to Ford's Theatre, where  George Washington and his childhood best friend, Abraham Lincoln, are watching a play. 

Arnold tells Abe that he is betraying the country, as he turns into a werewolf and bites off Abe’s neck. Before his death, Lincoln asks Washington to bring the American Revolutionary War to an end naming the future country "America." George chases Arnold through the town killing his soldiers but failing to kill him.

At Lincoln's funeral, Washington meets Martha Dandridge. She urges him to continue the revolution after the two have sex. To build a strong team, Washington teams up with beer loving party animal Samuel Adams and they recruit equestrian champion but socially awkward Paul Revere. They endeavor to recruit female Chinese scientist Thomas Edison, only to find that she is being executed by the British for testing science. However, she manages to escape and agrees to join George’s team. 

Finally they get Native American hunter Geronimo to join them knowing he has more knowledge about the land than anyone. They manage to track down Arnold at a Vietnam bar. Although the enemy has fled and Thomas blows up the bar, they conclude that the events in Vietnam were not a failure. The team asks for help from master blacksmith John Henry, who is to make a silver bullet for them to kill Arnold. To get the silver, they go to Boston to steal a mass supply of silver spoons from the Titanic. On board the ship, they learn that the British are bathing people in tea so they will come over to their side. They also discover plans of a secret British superweapon but fail to retrieve it because George accidentally spills tea everywhere, causing a fire that sinks the ship. Sam then proposes to the others that they will say the Titanic had hit an iceberg and that they were never there.

Arnold kidnaps Martha, who is to become the future wife of King James. Washington manages to find out about a Gettysburg Address where Arnold meets the king at a secret meeting. It turns out an ambush and Clyde, Revere's horse, dies sacrificing himself. King James appears at the Gettysburg address in the form of a hologram and offers Washington a battle the next morning at Attrition field; Washington agrees. 

Arnold kills the king and takes over the world himself. The next day the British army stands up against the American army which has been hastily assembled by Washington. On the British side there are among others, Elizabeth Tower in the form of a Transformer, London buses in the form of AT-ATs, and Arnold flying in a crown-shaped ship with a Venus flytrap like soccer ball. The Americans have a hundred-foot tall Paul Bunyan and Babe the Blue Ox, as well as Indians, Mexicans, African Americans, Asians, Arabs, ravers, Revere, who had fused himself with what was left of Clyde with nano-cybernetic technology by Clara Barton, and Johnny Appleseed.

During the war the British attempted to make the revolutionaries British by tainting the clouds with tea creating a tea rain, which was their superweapon from before. Edison, thanks to the power of science, manages to use the British weapons against them, turning tea into beer. When the beer rain falls, the British transform into bros, and it also cures Martha who had been turned British prior to the battle, changing her into a living Statue of Liberty. A final confrontation occurs with Arnold, who turns himself into a Mega Wolf and is eventually defeated with a silver bullet from Henry, who kills him with America's favorite pastime. A few days later, a ceremony is held for people to watch Sam blow up Arnold’s Monument.

Six months later, on July 4, 1776, Washington inaugurates the grand opening of America at the monument of his name. As George plans for I. M. Pei to build another memorial for his best friend to stare at his monument, the spirit of Abe comes back. It gives him the Declaration, repaired with tape, while Samuel becomes the uncle for George’s newborn son, Denzel. The inauguration goes as planned, but is disrupted when the crowd engages in a fight with each other, arguing over freeing the slaves, racism, women's rights, giving back the land to the natives, right to keep and bear arms, same-sex marriage, religious beliefs, free health care, and fair trials, making Washington nervous about the future of the country.

Cast

 Channing Tatum as George Washington
 Jason Mantzoukas as Samuel "Uncle Sam" Adams.
 Olivia Munn as Thomas Edison.
 Bobby Moynihan as Paul Revere
 Judy Greer as Martha Washington
 Will Forte as Abraham "Abe" Lincoln. Forte reprises his role from Clone High (2002-2003), The Lego Movie films (2014–2019) and Michelangelo and Lincoln: History Cops (2014).
 Raoul Max Trujillo as Geronimo
 Killer Mike as John Henry / Blacksmith
 Simon Pegg as King James
 Andy Samberg as Benedict "Cosby" Arnold.
 Carlos Alazraqui as Clyde
 Dave Callaham as I.M. Pei / LGBTQ rights activist
 Jeff Fastner as Ben Franklin
 Kevin Gillese as John Wilkes Booth / Titanic guard
 Zebbie Gillese as Transporter / Bros / Manchester the Soccer Ball
 J. Larose as Native American rights activist
 Megan Leahy as Clara Barton
 Amber Nash as women's rights activist / Anti-LGBTQ rights activist
 Eric Sims as Thomas Jefferson
 Mike Schatz as Fredrick Xavier Kinko / Hancock Supporter
 Matt Thompson as John Hancock / Colonist / Stand Your Ground rights activist
 Lucky Yates as Baseball Announcer / 2nd amendment rights activist

Production
In March 2017, producers Phil Lord and Christopher Miller announced that they would produce an R-rated animated Netflix original film called America: The Motion Picture with Will Allegra, Matt Thompson, Adam Reed, Channing Tatum, Reid Carolin and Peter Kiernan appearing in the movie. The screenplay was written by David Callaham and Thompson was the director.

Critical reception
 The website's critics consensus reads, "America: The Motion Picture is definitely outrageous and possibly patriotic—problem is, it's also not very funny." On Metacritic, the film has a weighted average score of 38 out of 100 based on 18 critics, indicating "generally unfavorable reviews".

Amy Nicholson of The New York Times described the film as "a raunchy, aggressively inane cartoon that flips the bird—both onscreen and thematically—to a strain of patriotism that insists that the slave owners who started this country were sober-minded heroes whose vision of democracy remains flawless, bro." Inkoo Kang of The Washington Post gave the film a score of 1.5/4 stars saying, "The gulf between stupid-smart and just plain stupid feels immeasurably vast when watching America: The Motion Picture, which is clearly aiming for the former but lands squarely in the latter." Brian Lowry of CNN described the film as "a movie that's loud and annoying more than truly provocative, peppered with pop-culture references that prove cleverer than its rewrite of US history."

Steve Greene of IndieWire gave the film a grade of C, describing it as "a goofy mishmash of riffs on prominent historical figures", and added: "Most of the time, it’s knowingly stupid, which makes watching it 90 minutes of occasional fun and frequent indifference." Melanie McFarland of Salon.com wrote: "Rarely have I seen a movie so confident that its viewers not only revel in American benightedness but are eager to identify with it"; she described the film as "not only a waste of time but an insult to ignoramuses."

Bill Goodykoontz of The Arizona Republic gave the film a score of 2.5/5 stars, writing that it "goes all in on its deranged version of the founding of the nation", but added: "It wears you down over time, but especially early on it's too satisfied just to be shocking and irreverent."

Michael Nordine of Variety was more positive in his review and wrote, "Though loyalists and sticklers for historical accuracy may not consider it their cup of tea, America will likely win over anyone who knows not to take it too seriously." Randy Myers of The Mercury News gave the film a score of 3/4 stars writing, "Even when you think it’s only acting rude and juvenile just because, it’s much smarter than that, particularly whenever it skewers American attitudes (both conservative and liberal)."

References

External links
 
 

2020s American animated films
2020s science fiction comedy films
2021 comedy films
2021 directorial debut films
2021 films
2021 animated films
2021 science fiction films
Adult animated comedy films
American adult animated films
American adventure films
American alternate history films
American comedy films
American fantasy films
American satirical films
American science fiction comedy films
American animated feature films
Animated films about robots
Animation based on real people
Cultural depictions of Benedict Arnold
Cultural depictions of George Washington
Cultural depictions of Geronimo
Cultural depictions of James VI and I
Cultural depictions of Paul Revere
Cultural depictions of Samuel Adams
Cultural depictions of Thomas Edison
Depictions of Abraham Lincoln on film
English-language Netflix original films
Films about George Washington
Films about shapeshifting
Films produced by Phil Lord and Christopher Miller
Films scored by Mark Mothersbaugh
Netflix Animation films
RMS Titanic in fiction
Steampunk films
2020s English-language films